The women's 1000 metres competition of the Short track speed skating at the 2015 Winter Universiade was held at the Universiade Igloo, Granada on February 13.

Results

Heats
 Q — qualified for Quarterfinals
 QT- qualified by time
 ADV — advanced
 PEN — penalty

Quarterfinals
 Q — qualified for Semifinals
 ADV — advanced
 PEN — penalty

Semifinals
 QA — qualified for Final A
 QB - qualified for Final B
 ADV — advanced
 PEN — penalty

Final B (classification round)

Final A (medal round)

Women's 1000
Univ